Jeremiah "Jerry" Bruner (born April 1, 1947) is an American professional golfer who won three times on the European Seniors Tour.

Bruner was inducted into the National Black Golf Hall of Fame in May 2016.

Professional wins (3)

European Senior Tour wins (3)

European Senior Tour playoff record (0–2)

Team appearances
Praia d'El Rey European Cup: 1999

References

External links

American male golfers
European Senior Tour golfers
African-American golfers
Golfers from Alabama
People from Greenville, Alabama
1947 births
Living people
21st-century African-American people
20th-century African-American sportspeople